Mikowice may refer to the following places in Poland:
Mikowice, Lower Silesian Voivodeship (south-west Poland)
Mikowice, Opole Voivodeship (south-west Poland)